Lukáš Mašek (born 8 May 2004) is a Czech professional footballer who plays as a forward for Mladá Boleslav.

Career statistics

Club

Notes

References

2004 births
Living people
Czech footballers
Czech Republic youth international footballers
Association football forwards
Czech First League players
FK Mladá Boleslav players
Czech National Football League players